Kia Sara (also Romanized as Kīā Sarā, Keyā Sarā, and Kiya Sara) is a village in Sangar Rural District, Sangar District, Rasht County, Gilan Province, Iran. At the 2006 census, its population was 636, in 205 families.

References 

Populated places in Rasht County